Talons is the first solo EP recorded by Josh Dies.  The album was released under DIES. The EP contains "re-imaginings" of two Showbread songs: "Never An Oceanographer" and "Age of Insects".  A cover of the Sullivan song, "Dig Me Up" is also present on the EP.

Track listing
 "Brundle Fly" 0:44
 "You're So Stupid" 3:05
 "Dig Me Up" 4:04
 "Never An Oceanographer" 4:09
 "Talons" 4:33
 "Age of Insects" 4:02
 "24 Hours" 2:27

Production mistakes

On the track listing, "Never An Oceanographer" is misprinted as "Never An Oceangrpaher."

References

Josh Dies albums
2009 EPs